A penumbral lunar eclipse took place on Friday, June 15, 1973, the second of four lunar eclipses in 1973, lasting over 3 hours. This very subtle penumbral eclipse was essentially invisible to the naked eye; though it lasted 3 hours, 24 minutes and 39.8 seconds, just 46.852% of the Moon's disc was in partial shadow (with no part of it in complete shadow). The Moon was only 0.2 days after apogee (Apogee on Friday, June 15, 1973 at 05:04 p.m. UTC), making it 6.5% smaller than average.

Visibility 
It was completely visible over eastern South America, Europe, Africa, the Indian Ocean, Asia and Australia, seen rising over the Atlantic Ocean and eastern South America, and setting over eastern Asia, western Pacific, and Australia.

Related lunar eclipses

Eclipses in 1973 
 An annular solar eclipse on Thursday, 4 January 1973.
 A penumbral lunar eclipse on Thursday, 18 January 1973.
 A penumbral lunar eclipse on Friday, 15 June 1973.
 A total solar eclipse on Saturday, 30 June 1973.
 A penumbral lunar eclipse on Sunday, 15 July 1973.
 A partial lunar eclipse on Monday, 10 December 1973.
 An annular solar eclipse on Monday, 24 December 1973.

Lunar year series

Half-Saros cycle
A lunar eclipse will be preceded and followed by solar eclipses by 9 years and 5.5 days (a half saros). This lunar eclipse is related to two partial solar eclipses of Solar Saros 117.

See also 
List of lunar eclipses
List of 20th-century lunar eclipses

Notes

External links 
 

1973-06
1973 in science
June 1973 events